The University of Borås (UB), or Högskolan i Borås, is a Swedish university college in the city of Borås. It was founded in 1977 and  has around 18,300 students and 803 staff. The Swedish School of Library and Information Science and Swedish School of Textiles are part of the university.

Description

Faculties and location
The University of Borås is a modern university located in the centre of the city. UB has 18,300 students and 803 employees 

As of 1 January 2021 the university is organised within four faculties: Faculty of Textiles, Engineering and Business, Faculty of Caring Science, Work Life and Social Welfare, Faculty of Librarianship, Information, Education and IT and Faculty of Police Work.

The university offers courses and study programmes within the areas of: Library and Information Science (at the Swedish School of Library and Information Science), Business and Informatics, Fashion and Textile Studies, Behavioural and Education Sciences, Engineering and Health Sciences, Police Work.

Research is organised in six areas: Business and IT, The Human Perspective in Care, Library and Information Science, Swedish Centre for Resource Recovery, Educational Work and Textiles and Fashion (design and general). The university is entitled to award doctoral degrees within three of these areas; Library and Information Science, Resource Recovery, The Human Perspective in Care and Textiles and Fashion (design and general).

The University of Borås is a member of the European University Association, EUA, which represents and supports higher education institutions in 46 countries.

History

The University of Borås was founded through the Swedish Higher Education reform of 1977. At that time, two educational programmes were already in place: The preschool seminar (based 1966) and the Librarian College (established 1972).

Timeline

1866 Technical School of Weaving (Väfskolan) is founded
1936 Technical School of Weaving becomes the Textile Institute
1940 West Sweden's College of Nursing is formed
1966 The Preschool Teacher Seminary (Förskollärarseminariet) is founded in Borås
1970 University courses from Gothenburg University are relocated to Borås
1972 The Swedish School of Library and Information Science (Bibliotekshögskolan) is established in Borås
1977 University of Borås is founded. 
1980 Business and IT courses begin
1982 The Textile Institute is nationalised and becomes The Swedish School of Textiles
1989 Engineering programme begins
1991 The municipal hand weaving training becomes a part of the university
1995 The university is authorised to confer one-year master's degrees
1996 Professorship in Library and Information Science is established
1999 The regional College of Nursing (Vårdhögskolan) becomes a school at the University of Borås
2000 First Professorial Inauguration 
2004 The university's new library opens
2007 The university is authorised to provide master-level education
2010 The university is authorised to provide research-level education in Library and Information Science, Resource Recovery and Textiles and Fashion (design and general)
2011 The university is certified to ISO 14001
2013 The Swedish School of Textiles moves to the new Textile Fashion Centre
2014 The first Conferment of Doctoral Degrees
2014 Reorganization consisting of a change from six departments (schools) to three faculties: Faculty of Textiles, Engineering and Business, Faculty of Caring Science, Work Life and Social Welfare and Faculty of Librarianship, Information, Education and IT
2015 The university has a full range of Master's programmes
2016 The university is authorised to provide research-level education in The Human Perspective in Care
2021 The university establishes the Faulty of Police Work

Faculties
Faculty of Textiles, Engineering and Business
Faculty of Caring Science, Work Life and Social Welfare
Faculty of Librarianship, Information, Education and IT
Faculty of Police Work

Vice-Chancellor
Ulf Dittmer 1977-1977
Nils-Bertil Faxén 1977-1989
Anders Fransson 1989-2001
Said Irandoust 2001-2005
Lena Nordholm 2006-2011
Björn Brorström 2011-2018
Mats Tinnsten 2019-

See also
List of colleges and universities in Sweden

References

Boras
Borås
Educational institutions established in 1977
1977 establishments in Sweden